Kenyatta University Hospital (Kenyatta University Teaching, Referral & Research Hospital (KUTRRH)) is a National Referral Hospital with a 650-bed capacity. The hospital is equipped to offer specialized Oncology, Trauma & Orthopedics, Renal, Accident & Emergency, among other services but the oncology center is its flagship project. The hospital was officially opened by His Excellency President Uhuru Kenyatta on 10th of September 2020 though it had been in operation since October 2019. The hospital is currently constructing an integrated molecular imaging center which should help in the treatment and diagnosis of cancer, one of the major reasons Kenyans travel abroad to seek.

Location
The hospital is located on a 100-acre piece of land that lies along the Nairobi Northern Bypass road, in the Northwestern part of the Kenyatta University. The main entrance is along the Northern Bypass road. The geographical coordinates of the hospital are: 01°10'33.0"S, 36°54'57.0"E (Latitude:-1.175833; Longitude:36.915833).

Overview
KUTRRH is a National Referral Hospital with a 650-bed capacity that offers specialized Oncology, Trauma & Orthopedics, Renal, Accident & Emergency, among other services.

It further offers both outpatient and inpatient services supported by radiology services, 24 bed ICU,  10 bed HDUs which are the highest bed capacities in Kenya and Theatres. It features additional support services and facilities such as a specialist clinics Plaza, Staff Quarters, Academic Block, Laundry & Catering Services, Restaurants, Funeral Home, Oxygen Plant, Water Treatment plant, Helipad, Banks, among others.

History
The growing demand for health care pushed the Kenyan Government to see the need to implement an effective health care system. With this in mind, the Kenyan Government held discussions with a leading Chinese Medical Corporation about the possibility of setting up a state-of-the-art medical facility in Kenya.

A follow-up visit by the then Minister for Health, Hon. Charity Ngilu culminated n the signing of a Memorandum of Understanding (MoU) in 2005. A cabinet paper

was then prepared and endorsed by Parliament in 2005.

The Management of Kenyatta University led by Prof. Olive Mugenda conceptualized the hospital project in 2008 and embarked on writing a proposal for it. The proposed project would have innovative and unique research and treatment centres that would fill the gaps in medical service provision in Kenya. This proposal was presented to the Ministry of Health, appealing for funding to set up a Teaching, Research and Referral Hospital.

With the support of the Kenyatta University Council, and the Government of Kenya through various Ministries and their Permanent Secretaries, the idea came to fruition with the signing of an M.O.U on Thursday, 21 April 2011 between the Chinese Government and the Government of Kenya.

The then Minister of Finance and  the former President of the Republic of Kenya, H.E. Uhuru Kenyatta signed the M.O.U on behalf of the Government of Kenya, and Mr. Li Changchun, a member of the Standing Committee of the Communist Party of China on behalf of the People's Republic of China. The signing was witnessed by the former President H.E. Mwai Kibaki at State House Nairobi.

Construction
The construction of this state of the art facility started in the year 2011. The construction process involved the creation of the hospital, a medical school, tuition block, student hostels, laboratories, staff quarters and Installation of modern medical equipment which was completed in 2016.

Opening of the hospital 
Legal notice No. 4 of 2019 issued on 25 January 2019 created KUTRRH as a state corporation. After that, the KUTRRH Board of Directors was established, and the process of operationalizing the hospital began. The hospital opened its doors for the patients on 28 October 2019.

Governance
The chairperson of the hospital's board of directors is Prof Olive Mugenda, the former Vice Chancellor of Kenyatta University.

Research & Innovation 
Some areas of interest include:  

 Telemedicine
 Public health
 Health management systems
 Sexual & reproductive health
 Paediatric health
 Communicable and non-communicable diseases
 Alternative medicine

References

External links
 There Has Been A Phenomenal Surge of Interest in Social Innovation As A Way to Achieve Sustainable Economic Growth (Slide Presentation) As of 13 May 2015.
 Compare This New Hospital in Ghana To the Eyesore Kenyatta University Has Just Built As of 3 March 2017.

Hospitals in Nairobi
Hospitals in Kenya
Medical education in Kenya
Teaching hospitals